Eugene Robert Kenna (24 October 1908 – 17 September 1971) was an Australian rules footballer who played with St Kilda in the Victorian Football League (VFL).

Notes

External links 

Bob Kenna's playing statistics from The VFA Project

1908 births
1971 deaths
Australian rules footballers from Victoria (Australia)
St Kilda Football Club players
Sandringham Football Club players